The Ibeno Beach is one of the beaches on the Atlantic Ocean along the shorelines of Ibeno. It is the longest sand beach in West Africa Qua Iboe River estuary is the major estuary in Ibeno Beach. Ibeno Beach stretches for about 30 kilometres from Ibeno to James Town along the Atlantic coastline of Akwa Ibom State in Nigeria. It is the best tourist site in Akwa Ibom State, With its beautiful coastline, Ibeno provides endless natural facilities for tourism, water sporting, beach soccer and general boating.

Location
Ibeno beach is located in Ibeno, a local government area of Akwa Ibom State in southeastern Nigeria, which it is named after.
The beach is one of the tourist attractions in Nigeria. In June 2010, there was a report of oil spill on the beach.

See also
 Bar Beach, Lagos

References

Beaches of Nigeria
Akwa Ibom State